La 9a Batalla (English:The Ninth Battle) is the ninth album by Colombian singer Silvestre Dangond and the first with the accordionist Rolando Ochoa, released by Sony Music on June 13, 2013.

Track listing

Charts

References

2013 albums
Sony Music Colombia albums
Sony Music Latin albums
Spanish-language albums
Silvestre Dangond albums